

Incumbents
President: Dalia Grybauskaitė
Prime Minister: Algirdas Butkevičius (until 14 November) Saulius Skvernelis (from 14 November)
Seimas Speaker: Loreta Graužinienė (until 14 November) Viktoras Pranckietis (from 14 November)

Events

 Cauliflower Revolution

August
August 5–21 - 49 athletes from Lithuania competed at the 2016 Summer Olympics in Rio de Janeiro, Brazil

Deaths 

 21 December: mixed martial artist and kickboxer Remigijus Morkevičius (born 1982)

References 

 
2010s in Lithuania
Years of the 21st century in Lithuania
Lithuania
Lithuania